The Boryeong Mud Festival is an annual festival which takes place during the summer in Boryeong, a town around 200 km south of Seoul, South Korea. The first Mud Festival was staged in 1998 and, by 2007, the festival attracted 2.2 million visitors to Boryeong.

The mud is taken from the Boryeong mud flats, and trucked to the Daecheon beach area, where it is used as the centrepiece of the 'Mud Experience Land'. The mud is considered rich in minerals and used to manufacture cosmetics. The festival was originally conceived as a marketing vehicle for Boryeong mud cosmetics.

Although the festival takes place over a period of around two weeks, it is most famous for its final weekend, which is popular with Korea's western population. The final weekend of the festival is normally on the second weekend in July.

History

In 1997 a range of cosmetics was produced using mud from the Boryeong mud flats. The clothes were said to be full of minerals, bentonites, and germaniums, all of which occur naturally in the mud from the area.

In order to promote these cosmetics, the Boryeong Mud Festival was conceived. Through this festival,  it was hoped people would learn more about the mud and the cosmetics.

Attractions

For the period of the festival several large attractions are erected in the seafront area of Daecheon. These include a mud pool, mud slides, mud prison and mud skiing competitions. This is a ticketed event and the tickets can be purchased online or at the venue. Colored mud is also produced for body painting. A large stage is erected on the beach, which is used for live music, competitions and various other visual attractions.

A small market runs along the seafront selling cosmetics made using the mud from Boryeong. Various health and beauty clinics offer massages, acupuncture and other treatments utilising the medicinal qualities of the mud.
The festival is closed with a large firework display.

Gallery

References

External links

https://www.facebook.com/boryeongmudfestnew/

 Official English Website
 Official site (in English)
 City of Boryeong Official site
 Additional Information about Korea Festival - Boryeong 2008
https://www.youtube.com/watch?v=vXArQWObOQY
 English site and Blog about Boryeong Mud Festival 2010

Tourist attractions in South Chungcheong Province
Recurring events established in 1998
Festivals in South Korea
Boryeong
Annual events in South Korea
Summer events in South Korea
1998 establishments in South Korea
July events